Saipan Sucks (SaipanSucks.com) was a politically and socially critical website about the United States's Commonwealth of the Northern Mariana Islands (CNMI), particularly its principal island Saipan. The website sought to call attention to what it alleged to be systemic societal corruption in the CNMI. It was in existence between 2001 and September 2014, and was reported on in a variety of ways in local, regional, and international newsprint and magazine outlets, on ABC Radio Australia, and Internet forums and blogs. The website was the subject of intense debate and scrutiny by the CNMI government, which threatened to sue the website's author.
In contrast, the site's author is celebrated in the 2012 novel The Master Blaster by writer and former Saipan Peace Corps Volunteer P. F. Kluge.

Content 

Saipan Sucks seeks to call attention to what it alleges to be systemic societal problems in the CNMI that are supported by misuse of United States taxpayer money. Press outlets have quoted the following excerpt from the website:
 	 
Nepotism rules on the islands. Fueled by money paid by American taxpayers and diverted to the far-off territory, politicians run for office primarily for the sake of being in a position to appoint their relatives to high-paying sinecures.
The website presents allegations of corruption, racism, nepotism, jury-rigging, worker exploitation, employment discrimination, and mismanagement of the CNMI tourism industry by local CNMI officials, and seeks to warn U.S. mainlanders about moving to the islands to accept employment offers.

Criticism 

Since July 2001, shortly after Saipan Sucks was created, CNMI government officials criticized the website's anonymity and characterized it as a "smear campaign". Stemming from its reported investigations, the CNMI government has threatened to sue the website's author for libel or defamation. The website author's response to the CNMI government was to state that they have "apparently never heard of the First Amendment to the United States Constitution … Is it possible the investigators don't recognize political and social commentary when they see it?"

In November 2006, a local environmental group, Beautify CNMI!, decried the website's high PageRank in search engines such as Google, and the fact that anyone who searches with the keyword "Saipan" could find the website in the top-ten search result positions. The group published a plan to counter the website's ranking through a campaign of linkspamming via Google bombing and text anchoring.

All along, counter-critics who are either Chamorros (indigenous people of Saipan) or those otherwise knowledgeable about the CNMI have maintained that, although Saipan Sucks uses hyperbole as a literary device, much or most of what it states is true and should be heeded.

Author 
Saipan Sucks was written by a person or persons going by the pseudonym "Forgetabilia". Reported investigations carried out by the CNMI government in July 2001 led to an alleged belief about a real identity behind this persona. Later, on November 16, 2006, a CNMI daily alleged that Saipan Sucks was written by a former CNMI Assistant Attorney General, who the daily reported as having "disliked his position" in the CNMI. The same day, a regional publication denied the claim, reiterating that the author or authors remain anonymous. Saipan Sucks closes by stating, "As for the authors of this essay, our days in Micronesia have ended … In all likelihood we shall remain happily for the rest of our days ensconced in anonymous Longnesia, suffering, with a little luck, from a selective am-nesia.  Hence our name – Forgetabilia."

As of September 10, 2014, the website was no longer available. However, it has been reposted at saipansucks.weebly.com.

See also 
 Anonymity and politics
 Demographics of the Northern Mariana Islands
 Economy of the Northern Mariana Islands
 Garapan
 Gripe site
 Micronesia
 Northern Mariana Islands Territory Constitution
 Northern Marianas College
 P.F. Kluge
 Politics of the Northern Mariana Islands
 United Nations Trust Territories

References

External links
August 2007 archive of Saipan Sucks website at archive.org
February 2014 archive of Saipan Sucks website at archive.org

American political websites
Asian political websites
Communications in the Northern Mariana Islands
Internet properties established in 2001
Politics of the Northern Mariana Islands
Saipan